The 1909 Berlin International Tournament was the second edition of the Berlin International Tournament, an international ice hockey tournament. It was held from March 3-6, 1909, in Berlin, Germany. Akademischer SC 1906 Dresden won the tournament.

Tournament

First round

Semifinals

Final

References

External links
 Tournament on hockeyarchives.info

Berlin
Berlin International Tournament
ice hockey
1908–09 in German ice hockey